Berukhi is a Pakistani drama television series produced by Abdullah Seja under banner iDream Entertainment. It is directed by Mohsin Mirza and written by Ghazala Naqvi. It stars Hiba Bukhari and Junaid Khan in their third project together after Silsilay (2018) and Inteha-e-Ishq (2021) while Nazish Jahangir as an antagonist. It first aired on 15 September 2021 on ARY Digital.

Cast 

 Hiba Bukhari as Sabeen Ahmed/Sabeen Irteza Ali Baig
 Junaid Khan as Irteza Ali Baig
 Nazish Jahangir as Maira Mansoor 
 Iffat Rahim as Nazia Mansoor
 Saba Hameed as Shah Bano
 Rehan Sheikh as Mansoor Ahmad
 Usman Peerzada as Agha Jaan
 Hassan Ahmed 
 Nida Mumtaz as Sabeen's mother
 Noor ul Hassan 
 Afshan Qureshi as Atiya
 Birjees Farooqui as Saima
 Hira Umer

References

External links
  

ARY Digital original programming
2021 Pakistani television series debuts
Pakistani drama television series
Urdu-language television shows